Chaupimayo (possibly from Quechua chawpi central, middle, mayu river) is a  mountain in the Vilcabamba mountain range in the Andes of Peru. It is situated in the Cusco Region, La Convención Province, on the border of the districts of Santa Teresa and Vilcabamba. Chaupimayo lies northeast of Choquetacarpo and Pumasillo.

References

Mountains of Peru
Mountains of Cusco Region